"We Don't Talk Anymore" is a song recorded by Cliff Richard that reached number one in the UK Singles Chart in August 1979, remaining there for four weeks. Produced by the Shadows' rhythm guitarist, Bruce Welch, and written by Alan Tarney, it was Cliff Richard's tenth UK number one and his first since "Congratulations" in 1968.

Background and release
Tarney wrote the song in 1979, planning to use it on an album with the Tarney/Spencer Band. However, Tarney played a demo of the song to Welch during a break in recording sessions for Where to Now by Charlie Dore (which the two were producing). Welch instantly knew it was going to be a hit and phoned up Richard's manager Peter Gormley, as he believed "there was only one person who could record it — Cliff Richard". It was then quickly recorded in May 1979 at RG Jones Recording Studios in Wimbledon.

It was released as a stop-gap single between the albums Green Light and Rock 'n' Roll Juvenile. However, it wasn't meant to be included on Rock 'n' Roll Juvenile, as Richard didn't think it was appropriate for "an energy packed album of progressive rock 'n' roll". However, record label EMI were insistent on including it after it became a massive hit and Richard reluctantly conceded. Due to the single's success, Tarney was brought in to produce Richard's next two albums I'm No Hero and Wired for Sound and has said that ""We Don't Talk Anymore should really have been on I'm No Hero".

The single release featured the B-side "Count Me Out", which was written by Terry Britten and Welch and was taken from Green Light. In several European countries an 12-inch single was released, featuring an extended slightly remixed version of the song that runs to seven minutes long. This version has never been released on CD. The US release of the single features an edited version of "We Don't Talk Anymore", which fades over half a minute early.

In December 1990, a remixed version of "We Don't Talk Anymore" was released as a single in continental Europe and in Australasia in November 1991. Taken from the live album From a Distance: The Event, it was remixed by Ian Curnow and Phil Harding at the PWL Studios. The single failed to chart.

Sales
Coming just before his 39th birthday, and just when it was announced that he was to receive the OBE for services to music, the record cemented his comeback, which continued well into the 1980s and 1990s. The single was his biggest worldwide seller; it was number one in Germany for five weeks (his only English-language German chart-topper, though he had two German-language number ones there in the 1960s), and reached number seven on the Billboard Hot 100 singles chart in the United States. The fact that its chart run extended beyond the end of 1979 meant Richard became the first act to reach the Hot 100's top 40 in the 1950s, 1960s, 1970s and 1980s.

The single sold over 4 million copies worldwide, topping the charts in the UK, Austria, Belgium (Flanders), Finland, West Germany, Ireland, Norway and Switzerland. It was certified Gold in both the UK and West Germany.

During the single's run at the Number 1 position the UK Singles Chart, Norrie Paramor, Richard's original producer who guided his early career in the late 1950s and 1960s, passed away on 9 September 1979

The song was the sixth video aired on MTV on its launch on 1 August 1981.

Track listings

1979 releases
7"
 "We Don't Talk Anymore" – 4:13
 "Count Me Out" – 4:15

7" (US)
 "We Don't Talk Anymore" – 3:40
 "Count Me Out" – 4:13

12"
 "We Don't Talk Anymore" – 6:54
 "Count Me Out" – 4:11

1990 releases
7"
 "We Don't Talk Anymore" – 4:38
 "From a Distance" – 4:41

12" & CD
 "We Don't Talk Anymore" – 8:13
 "From a Distance" – 4:41
 "We Don't Talk Anymore" – 4:38

Personnel
 Cliff Richard – vocals
 Alan Tarney – guitar, keyboards, synthesizer, bass, backing vocals
 Trevor Spencer – drums

Charts and certifications

Weekly charts

Year-end charts

Certifications

Other versions
 Due to sanctions on the EMI label in Rhodesia (now known as Zimbabwe), Richard's version was not able to be released there. Therefore, a cover version by Robin Young was released, which peaked at number 2 in December 1979.
 In 1979, Mary Roos released a German-language version of the song, titled "Ich werde geh'n heute Nacht", which peaked at number 25 on the German Singles Chart.
 In 1980, Brotherhood of Man covered the song on their album Sing 20 Number One Hits.
 In 1981, the Shadows released an instrumental version of the song on their album Hits Right Up Your Street.
 In 1982, Cliff Richard recorded a live version with the London Philharmonic Orchestra, which was released on the 1983 album Dressed for the Occasion.

References

External links
 

1979 singles
Cliff Richard songs
EMI Records singles
UK Singles Chart number-one singles
European Hot 100 Singles number-one singles
Number-one singles in Denmark
Number-one singles in Finland
Number-one singles in Germany
Irish Singles Chart number-one singles
Number-one singles in Israel

Number-one singles in Norway
Number-one singles in Switzerland
Ultratop 50 Singles (Flanders) number-one singles
Songs written by Alan Tarney
1979 songs